Boyscout was a Thai boy band famous and popular in the 1990s under RS Promotion.

History
All three members of this band were former actors who were played as the students in A-Nueng-Kid-Tung-Por-Sung-Khaeb. Boyscout was the first boy band to form as a trio at RS Promotion. They were the second boy band to appear with Hijack.

The band released two studio albums in 1993 and 1995, and a one-off special album.

While promoting the release of their third studio album, band member Ta-Winrawee was found to be a drugs criminal. Because of this they decided to eventually split up.

After 15 years, Boyscout returned as a band again.  They regained some fame, until Joe-Tanut Chimtaum died from a heart attack on September 11, 2017.

Members
Ta- (ต๊ะ : วินรวีร์ ใหญ่เสมอ) born name Chanis Yaisamoe (ฌานิศ ใหญ่เสมอ)
Dip– (ดิ๊พ : ทรงพล คล้ายพงษ์พันธ์) born name Thanaphol Khaipongpan (ธนพงษ์ คล้ายพงษ์พันธ์)
Joe– (โจ : ธนัท ฉิมท้วม)(death September 11, 2017) born name Thaneth Chimtaum (ธเนศ ฉิมท้วม)

Discography

Studio albums
Wai Lai Mai Chai Len Len (ไว้ลายไม่ใช่เล่นๆ) 1993
Gang Jai Ngai (Easy Gangster) (แก๊งใจง่าย) 1995
Small Dream Project 2011

Compilation albums
R.S. Unplugged 1994
Superteens 1996
Boyscout Replay 1996

Filmography
I Miss You (อนึ่งคิดถึงพอสังเขป) (lead role by Ann Thongprasom) 1992

References 

1992 establishments in Thailand
1996 disestablishments in Thailand
Thai pop music groups
Thai boy bands
Musical groups from Bangkok